The Wedding is a Philippine romantic-comedy television series aired over at ABS-CBN starring Anne Curtis, Zanjoe Marudo and Derek Ramsay. The show ran for 10 weeks on Primetime Bida. It aired from June 29, 2009, to September 4, 2009, replacing Pinoy Bingo Night.

Production
The original airing date was May 11, 2009, but during that time, Eula Valdez still had commitments with All About Eve on GMA Network. They made a deal to air the series after the end of her show on the rival network.

Plot
Candice de Meñes (Anne Curtis), is a loving daughter who will do everything to prevent her parents from separating. In her desperate attempt to save her parents’ relationship, she will scheme her engagement to Mr. Wrong, Marlon (Zanjoe Marudo), a poor engineer working for her father. Candice's initial scheme develops into a full-fledged whirlwind romance leading to preparations for a real wedding to prove the true love they have found. But what if Candice's first and great love Warren (Derek Ramsay), the Mr. Right she has waited for so long, returns to claim her back? What will Candice choose – a love worth fighting for or a love worth waiting for?

Cast

Main cast
Anne Curtis as Candice de Meñes - a hopeless romantic girl who dreams that one day she will walk down the aisle with her dream man. She resorts to the desperate act of getting engaged to a complete stranger to ease tensions between her parents and prevent them from separating.
Zanjoe Marudo as Marlon Mañalac - is a hardworking contractor born into a poor family whose ambition to live a well-off life will drive him to accept Candice's proposal. He is considered as Candice's true love. Candice and Marlon will end up falling in love.
Derek Ramsay as Warren Garcintorena/Philip Garcintorena - Warren is a wealthy swimmer and promiscuous party animal. Although his charm attracts most of the women, his one great love is Candice, his childhood sweetheart. He is considered Candice's first love and ideal dream man. He has also a long-lost older identical twin brother named Philip as a priest.

Supporting cast
Michael de Mesa as Frank de Meñes
Eula Valdez as Audrey de Meñes
William Martinez as Sammy Mañalac
Irma Adlawan as Grace Mañalac
Chinggoy Alonzo as Orson Garcintorena
Tetchie Agbayani as Natalie Aquino
Megan Young as Janice de Castro
Angel Sy as Shirley Mañalac

Extended cast
Desiree del Valle as Oona
Alwyn Uytingco as Clark
Hiyasmin Neri as Sophia
Zeppi Borromeo as Elvis
Jaja Gonzales as Ingrid
Baron Geisler as Monty
Neil Ryan Sese as Charlie
Perla Bautista as Yaya Greta
Lito Legaspi as Lawrence
Mich Dulce as Tina
Luane Dy as Vivien
Nanding Josef as Lolo Bogart
Neil Coleta as Mark

Guest cast
Izzy Canillo as Young Warren
Quintin Alianza as Young Marlon
Kian Kazemi as Von
Frenchie Dy as Marilyn
Bam Romana as Rex
Macy Garcia as Kathleen
Richard Poon as Himself
John James Uy as Sam
Ricky Rivero
Michael Cruz

See also
 List of shows previously aired by ABS-CBN

References

External links
The Wedding The Wedding Drama
The Wedding ABS-CBN
The Wedding Telesyese Drama
The Wedding Multiply

ABS-CBN drama series
2009 Philippine television series debuts
2009 Philippine television series endings
Philippine romantic comedy television series
Filipino-language television shows
Television shows set in the Philippines